"The Bird on My Head" is a 1958 novelty song by Ross Bagdasarian.

Background 
"The Bird on My Head" was the second novelty song to be recorded under the stage name "David Seville" (after seven consecutive songs beginning with "Armen's Theme"), as well as the last song to be recorded before the creation of Alvin and the Chipmunks. Like Seville's first novelty song, "Witch Doctor", the song has a sped-up voice (albeit slightly slower than the one Seville used for "Witch Doctor"). Although both songs have the same sped-up voices, "The Bird on My Head" did not achieve the success of its predecessor, peaking at No. 34.

Lyrics
The lyrics describe a man with a bird sitting on his head, sitting in a vacant lot. Throughout the song, the man and the bird sing together talking about where they belong and lamenting their current position — the man lacking a house and wife, and the bird not having a tree.

Track listing
All songs composed by Ross Bagdasarian Sr.
 "The Bird on My Head" (2:10)
 "Hey There Moon" (2:05)

References

1958 singles
Novelty songs
Songs about birds
Songs about loneliness
Songs written by Ross Bagdasarian
1958 songs
Liberty Records singles